Jeffrey Philip Fiorentino (born April 14, 1983) is an American former Major League Baseball outfielder who played for the Baltimore Orioles and Oakland Athletics between 2005 and 2009.  His nickname is Screech due to his resemblance to the Dustin Diamond character from the television situation comedy Saved by the Bell.

Playing career

Amateur
A native of Pembroke Pines, Florida, Fiorentino attended Nova High School and Florida Atlantic University, where he played baseball for the Owls under head coach Kevin Cooney. In 2003, he played collegiate summer baseball with the Cotuit Kettleers of the Cape Cod Baseball League.

Baltimore Orioles
During the  season, he played several games for the Baltimore Orioles after being called up from the Single-A Frederick Keys. He was then sent back down after nearly two weeks of action at the major league level.

Cincinnati Reds
The Orioles designated Fiorentino for assignment on January 2, and on January 4 he was claimed by the Cincinnati Reds.

Oakland Athletics
On January 25, he was claimed off waivers by the Oakland Athletics.

Second stint with Orioles
After being designated for assignment on May 30, he was claimed off waivers by his original team, the Orioles, on June 5.

Hiroshima Toyo Carp
On January 31, 2010, Fiorentino signed a minor league contract with the Baltimore Orioles. He was released to sign with the Hiroshima Toyo Carp of Nippon Professional Baseball.

Atlanta Braves
Fiorentino was traded to the Atlanta Braves on May 4, 2011, in return for cash. He joined the Double-A Mississippi Braves.

Oakland Athletics
On November 19, 2011, he signed a minor league contract with the Oakland Athletics. He was released on June 2, 2012.

York Revolution
On July 13, 2012, Fiorentino signed with the York Revolution of the Atlantic League of Professional Baseball. He was released on June 16, 2013.

Coaching career

Florida Atlantic University
Fiorentino joined the staff of his alma mater in the summer of 2014.  He worked primarily with the outfielders, hitters, and base runners.  During his one year on staff, FAU made it to the championship game of the Gainesville Regional where they were defeated by the Florida Gators.

Chipola College
Fiorentino joined the Chipola College coaching staff in the summer of 2015.  He currently works primarily with the infielders, catchers, hitters and base runners.  Fiorentino helped guide the Indians to back-to-back Junior College World Series championship titles in 2017 and 2018.  Also during his tenure, Chipola was the first team from Region XIII since the 1960s to participate in the Junior College World Series three consecutive years by winning the state tournament from 2017 through 2019. There have been 20 players selected in the Major League Baseball Amateur Draft during his first four years on staff at Chipola.

References

External links
 RLPA

1983 births
Living people
Baltimore Orioles players
Oakland Athletics players
Major League Baseball outfielders
Baseball players from Florida
Florida Atlantic Owls baseball players
Cotuit Kettleers players
Aberdeen IronBirds players
Delmarva Shorebirds players
Frederick Keys players
Bowie Baysox players
Norfolk Tides players
Sacramento River Cats players
American expatriate baseball players in Japan
Hiroshima Toyo Carp players
Mississippi Braves players
Gwinnett Braves players
York Revolution players
People from Pembroke Pines, Florida